Di'Anno was a band featuring former Iron Maiden singer Paul Di'Anno, whom the band was named after.

The band has released the albums Di'Anno and Live from London. In the year 2000, the album Nomad was released under the band name of Di'Anno, with different musicians.
The initial line-up featured Paul Ward on guitar, Lee Slater (ex-Minas Tirith) on guitar, Mark Venables (ex-Minas Tirith) on keyboards, Kevin Browne (ex-Minas Tirith) on bass and Mark Stewart (ex-Minas Tirith) on drums. 

For the album, drummer Stewart was replaced by Dave Irving, who in turn was replaced by ex-Def Leppard, Waysted and Roadhouse drummer Frank Noon.

After this, Paul Di'Anno was hired to join Gogmagog with future Iron Maiden guitarist Janick Gers, former Iron Maiden drummer Clive Burr, along with other musicians to form this "supergroup".

Discography
Di'Anno (1984)
 Live from London (1985)
Nomad (2000)

English heavy metal musical groups
New Wave of British Heavy Metal musical groups